The following is a list of notable events and releases that happened in 1998 in music in South Korea.

Debuting and disbanded in 1998

Debuting
1TYM
Can
Crying Nut
Eve
Fin.K.L
Pia
Sharp
Shinhwa

Solo debuts

Bobby Kim
Cho PD
Kim Dong-ryul
J
Johan Kim
Kim Jin-pyo
Kim Yeon-woo
Jo Sung-mo
Lena Park
Seo Taiji
Yang Hyun-suk

Disbandments
U-BeS

Releases in 1998

January

February

March

April

May

June

July

August

September

October

November

December

References

 
South Korean music
K-pop